Edward Lane (March 27, 1842 – October 30, 1912) was an American teacher, lawyer, judge and Democratic politician who served four terms in the United States House of Representatives from Illinois.

Born in Cleveland, Ohio, March 27, 1842, he moved to Illinois in May 1858 with his parents, who settled in Hillsboro, Montgomery County. Lane attended the common schools and graduated from Hillsboro Academy, then became a schoolteacher for several years. Lane then read law and was admitted to the Illinois bar in February 1865. He began his legal practice in Hillsboro and served as the city attorney for three years. Local voters elected him judge of the Montgomery County Court in November 1869, and he served until 1873. Lane won election as a Democrat to the Fiftieth and to the three succeeding Congresses (March 4, 1887 – March 3, 1895). He rose; chairman, Committee on Militia (Fifty-second Congress). Defeated for reelection in 1894 to the Fifty-fourth Congress by Republican James A. Connolly, Lane resumed his legal practice in Hillsboro. Lane died on October 30, 1912, and was interred in Oak Grove Cemetery.

External links

1842 births
1912 deaths
Illinois state court judges
Democratic Party members of the United States House of Representatives from Illinois
19th-century American politicians
People from Hillsboro, Illinois
19th-century American judges